Cotonopsis turrita is a species of sea snails in the family Columbellidae. It is found in West America.

External links 
 

Columbellidae
Gastropods described in 1832